'''HAZ Sport Agency  is a sports agency found by Fernando Hidalgo and Pini Zahavi. Instead of broker business, the company also involved in third-party ownership in association football. The company bought economic rights of footballer from the club for the beneficiary behind the company.

Notable third-party deals
  Guillermo Burdisso (25%)
  Bruno Pereira Mendes
  Néstor Ortigoza (50%)

References

See also
 Media Sports Investment
 Rio Football Services

Association football organizations